The European Communities (Spanish and Portuguese Accession) Act 1985 (c. 75) is an Act of the Parliament of the United Kingdom which ratified and legislated for the accession of Spain and Portugal to the European Communities. It received royal assent on 19 December 1985.

See also
Treaty of Accession 1985
List of Acts of the Parliament of the United Kingdom relating to the European Communities / European Union

References

United Kingdom Acts of Parliament 1985
Acts of the Parliament of the United Kingdom relating to the European Union